Protein SDA1 homolog is a protein that in humans is encoded by the SDAD1 gene.

References

Further reading